Livadochori may refer to several places in Greece:

Livadochori, Lemnos, a village on Lemnos Island, North Aegean
Livadochori, Serres, a village in the municipal unit Strymoniko, Serres regional unit
Livadochori, Trikala, a village in the municipal unit Pindos, Trikala regional unit